Tomás Lipovšek Puches (born 17 April 1993) is a Slovenian–Argentine tennis player.

Lipovšek Puches has a career high ATP singles ranking of 250 achieved on 25 April 2016. He also has a career high ATP doubles ranking of 214 achieved on 2 October 2017. In February 2016, Lipovsek Puches made his ATP main draw debut at the 2016 Argentina Open, where he received a wildcard into the doubles draw partnering Manuel Peña López. They lost in the first round to Guido Pella and Diego Schwartzman. His professional debut had also been against his compatriot Diego Schwartzman, in April 2011, losing 3-6 0-6 at a Futures event in his native Argentina.  

In May 2019, Lipovšek Puches switched nationalities to represent Slovenia. He returned to play for Argentina in 2022.

ATP Challenger and ITF Futures finals

Singles: 15 (7–8)

Doubles: 48 (30–18)

References

External links

1993 births
Living people
Argentine male tennis players
Slovenian male tennis players
Argentine people of Slovenian descent